The 2003 Missouri Tigers football team represented the University of Missouri during the 2003 NCAA Division I-A football season.  The Tigers had an overall record of 8–5, including a 4–4 record in conference play, and a 27–14 loss to Arkansas in the Independence Bowl at Shreveport.  They played their home games at Faurot Field in Columbia, Missouri.  They were members of the Big 12 Conference in the North Division.  The team was coached by head coach Gary Pinkel.

Schedule

References

Missouri
Missouri Tigers football seasons
Missouri Tigers football